Lotta Sollander (born 3 July 1953 in Frösön) is a Swedish former alpine skier, who competed in the 1972 Winter Olympics. She is the daughter of Stig Sollander.

References 

1953 births
Swedish female alpine skiers
Alpine skiers at the 1972 Winter Olympics
Olympic alpine skiers of Sweden
People from Frösön
Living people
Sportspeople from Jämtland County
20th-century Swedish women